Michael Gurian (born 1943) is an American-born guitarist and luthier of Armenian descent. He had some initial furniture making experience when he became a guitar teacher at the Guitar Workshop, Roslyn, New York in 1961.

He studied classical guitar making with, among others, luthiers Gene Clark, David Rubio, and Manuel Velazquez. His interest in the classical guitar and subsequently, the steel-string acoustic guitar stimulated experiments in guitar building which led to the formation of the Gurian Guitar Company which was active from approx. 1965 to 1981. Gurian guitars were well received by acoustic and folk players of the day but the company suffered a disastrous fire in 1979 and was closed in 1982.

Subsequently he formed a new company, Gurian Instruments, which currently supplies materials and custom parts for the musical instrument, furniture and wood craft supply industries out of a floating facility in Seattle, Washington, although according to one video interview (see "External Links") he has not completely discounted the idea of returning to guitar making one day. As one of the "first wave" of independent luthiers working in the U.S.A. he mentored a number of younger makers in the field including Joe Veillette, Michael Millard and William R. Cumpiano of Froggy Bottom Guitars, Scott Hausmann, Thomas Humphrey and David Santo, as well as being a precursor to other "boutique" guitar making operations which followed such as Mossman, Santa Cruz, and Collings.

See also
 Gurian Guitars

References

External links
 Video interview: Michael Gurian (NAMM Oral History Program)
 Video: "A Rare Bird: A portrait of luthier Michael Gurian" (Fretboard Journal)

1943 births
Living people
American luthiers
20th-century American guitarists